Lake Shore Drive is a roadway in Chicago, Illinois.

Lake Shore Drive or Lakeshore Drive may also refer to:

Transportation
Lake Shore Drive (Grosse Pointe) or Jefferson Avenue, a scenic road in the Detroit metropolitan area in Michigan
 Lake Shore Drive, part of County Route 16  in Suffolk County, New York
Lakeshore Drive, New Orleans, a street in Lakeshore/Lake Vista, New Orleans
Tennessee State Route 375, known as Lakeshore Drive

Popular culture
Lake Shore Drive (album), a 1973 album by Aliotta Haynes Jeremiah
"Lake Shore Drive" (song)
"Lake Shore Driving", a song by Duran Duran from the 1988 album Big Thing

See also
Lake Shore Drive Bridge (disambiguation) 
M-185 (Michigan highway) or Lake Shore Road, Mackinac Island, Michigan